The 1984 CECAFA Cup was the 12th edition of the tournament. It was held in Uganda, and was won by Zambia. The matches were played between December 1–15.

Group A

Group B

Before the match, Malawi has secured qualification, and Zanzibar has already been eliminated. After Kenya made a draw with Somalia, they were tied; so they went into penalty shootout to determine the remaining qualification slot.

Semi-finals

Third place match

Final

References
Rsssf archives

CECAFA Cup
1984 in Ugandan football
International association football competitions hosted by Uganda
CECAFA